Thunberg is a surname. Notable people with the surname include:

Carl Peter Thunberg (1743–1828), Swedish naturalist
Anna Sofia Thunberg (1790–1871), Swedish opera singer 
Clas Thunberg (1893–1973), Finnish speed skater
Greta Thunberg (born 2003), Swedish climate activist
Lage Thunberg (1905–1977), Swedish Air Force general
Olof Thunberg (1925–2020), Swedish actor and director
Svante Thunberg (born 1969), Swedish actor, producer and author
Torsten Thunberg (1873–1952), Swedish physiologist

See also 
Tunberg

Swedish-language surnames